Carolina Peleritti (born July 2, 1971) is an Argentine actress and former fashion model. She as born in Buenos Aires and took part in many TV series such as  Boro Boro, La Marca del Deseo, Cybersix and 099 Central.

Filmography
Cinema
 Geisha (1995)
 El lado oscuro del corazón 2 (2001)
 Samy y yo (2001)
 The Incredibles (2004, Rioplatense Spanish voice as Mirage)
 ¿Quién dice que es fácil? (2006)
 XXY (2006)

Tv series
 Boro Boro (1992)
 La Marca del Deseo (1995)
 Good Show (with Tato Bores)
 Mi Cuñado
 Cybersix (1995)
 Infieles (2000, 2001)
 099 Central (2002)
 Resistiré (2003)
 Historias de sexo de gente común (2004, 2005)
 Jesús el Heredero (2004)
 Ringtone (2005)
 Malparida (2010)
 Kissing Game (2020)

Theatre
 Orinoco (1999, 2000)
 Confesiones de Mujeres de 30 (2000, 2001)
 12 Polvos - Títeres Porno (2001)
 Monólogos de la Vagína (2001)
 De Rigurosa Etiqueta (2002)
 Porteñas (2003)
 La Señorita de Tacna (2004, 2005)

External links
 Interview 
 Unofficial Site 
 Model Profile at www.dottomodels.net 
 

1971 births
Argentine film actresses
Argentine stage actresses
Argentine television actresses
Argentine female models
Actresses from Buenos Aires
Living people
20th-century Argentine actresses
21st-century Argentine actresses